Clementina may refer to:

Literature
Clementine literature, or Clementina, a 2nd-century religious romance
Clementina (play), a 1771 tragedy by Hugh Kelly
Clementina (character), a fictional character in the Jeeves series

Other uses
Clementina (computer), an early scientific computer
Clementina (given name), including a list of people with the name
Clementina (zarzuela), a 1786 Spanish zarzuela by Luigi Boccherini
Clementina, São Paulo, Brazil

See also 
 
 
 Clementine (disambiguation)